Saint-Ouen-la-Rouërie is a former commune in the Ille-et-Vilaine department in Brittany in northwestern France. On 1 January 2019, it was merged into the new commune Val-Couesnon.

Location

Saint-Ouen's adjoining communes are Sacey and Montanel in Manche, and Coglès, Tremblay, and Antrain, in Ille-et-Vilaine.

Population
Inhabitants of Saint-Ouen-la-Rouërie are called audoniens in French.

Sights
The 18th-century Château de la Rouërie

See also
Communes of the Ille-et-Vilaine department

References

External links

 

Former communes of Ille-et-Vilaine